The Eyes of the World is a 1920 German silent film directed by Carl Wilhelm and starring Conrad Veidt, Ressel Orla and Anton Edthofer.

The film's sets were designed by the art director Artur Günther.

Cast
Conrad Veidt as Julianne's Lover, Johannes Kay
Ressel Orla as Juliane van Derp
Anton Edthofer as Heinz Kay
Willy Prager as Henrik van Derp
Emil Heyse as Justizrat ter Holt
Lotte Koopmann as Dagmar
Karl Platen as Prof. Hanous
Fritz Rimpler as Björn
Berthold Rose as Cellini
Julius Sachs as Pastor Swensen
Henny Steimann as Rebekka Kay
Fritz Witte-Wild as Goldsmith Klaus
Max Zilzer as Ralph Courtius

References

External links

Films of the Weimar Republic
German silent feature films
Films directed by Carl Wilhelm
German black-and-white films
Terra Film films
1920s German films